was a Japanese daimyō of the early Edo period.

Biography 

Born the ninth son of Tokugawa Ieyasu with his concubine, Okame no Kata. His childhood name was Gorōtamaru (五郎太丸). While still a young child, he was appointed leader of first the fief of Kofu in Kai Province and later the fief of Kiyosu in Owari Province. In 1610, he was appointed leader of the Owari Domain (present-day Nagoya), one of the most important regions in the country, thus founding the Owari-Tokugawa house. A holder of the 2nd court rank, junior grade (ju-ni-i), he had the title of dainagon (major counselor).

During the Kan'ei era (1624-44) he had a kiln constructed at the corner of the Ofuke enceinte (Ofukemaru) of Nagoya Castle and invited potters from Seto to make pottery there. This became known as Ofukei ware. 

Yoshinao began learning Shinkage-ryū from Yagyū Hyōgonosuke at age 16, and was named the 4th sōke at age 21.

His remains were cremated and laid to rest at his mausoleum in Jōkō-ji (Seto).

Family 
Yoshinao's principal wife was Haruhime, the daughter of Asano Yoshinaga of Kii (whose family was later transferred to Hiroshima), and his concubines included Osai and Ojō no Kata. He had two children: Mitsutomo, who succeeded him as daimyō of Owari, and Shiko or Kyōhime who married Hirohata Tadayuki, a court noble.

 Father: Tokugawa Ieyasu
 Mother: Okame no Kata (1573–1642) later Sōōin
 Wife: Asano Haruhime (1593–1637) later Kōgen-in, daughter of Asano Yoshinaga of Kishū Domain
 Concubines: 
 Osai no Kata later Sadashin-in
 Ojō no Kata later Kankiin
 Children:
 Tokugawa Mitsutomo by Ojō
 Kyōhime (1626–1674) by Osai and married Hirohata Tadayuki

References
Tokugawa, Munefusa (2005). Tokugawa yonhyakunen no naishobanashi. Tokyo: Bunshun-bunko.

External links 

1601 births
1650 deaths
Lords of Owari
Deified Japanese people